Frauenstein mey refer to the following places:

In Austria
Frauenstein, Austria, in Carinthia

In Germany
Frauenstein, Saxony, in the district of Mittelsachsen
Wiesbaden-Frauenstein, part of Wiesbaden, Hesse